"Ain't Got Far to Go" is a song by English singer and songwriter Jess Glynne. It was written by Glynne along with Janée "Jin Jin" Bennett, Knox Brown, and Finlay "Starsmith" Dow-Smith for her debut studio album, I Cry When I Laugh (2015), while production was helmed by Brown and Dow-Smith. The song was released as the album's sixth single on 26 February 2016. Prior to the single's release, the song charted at number 46 on the Scottish Singles Chart and number 67 on the UK Singles Chart. After the single's release, it peaked at number 45 on the UK Singles Chart.

Music video
An accompanying music video for "Ain't Got Far to Go" was directed by Declan Whitebloom, showing Glynne and her friends enjoying a day in Havana, Cuba. It marked their second collaboration following his work on previous single “Take Me Home.” Commenting on the output, Glynne elaborated: “Making this video in Cuba was so fitting, the journey the colors the people everything was so perfect. We met some amazing people who were so grateful, charming and hard-working and that’s what this song is about."

Track listing

Credits and personnel
Credits adapted from the liner notes of I Cry When I Laugh.

 Janée "Jin Jin" Bennet – writing, backing vocals
 Knox Brown – writing, production, vocal production, backing vocals, instruments
Fin "Starsmith" Dow-Smith – writing, production, vocal production, instruments
 Serban Ghenea – mixing
 Jess Glynne – writing, lead vocals

 John Hanes – mix engineering
 Stuart Hawkes – mastering
 Liam Nolan – vocals engineering
 James Wyatt – strings, arrangement

Charts

Weekly charts

Year-end charts

Certifications

Release history

References

External links
 JessGlynne.co.uk — official site

2015 songs
2016 singles
Jess Glynne songs
Atlantic Records singles
Song recordings produced by Starsmith
Songs written by Starsmith
Songs written by Jin Jin (musician)
Songs written by Jess Glynne